EarthQuaker Devices is an effects pedal manufacturer located in Akron, Ohio that was founded by Jamie Stillman and Julie Robbins in 2004. EarthQuaker is part of the boutique guitar pedal industry.

History 
EarthQuaker Devices was started in founder Jamie Stillman's basement in West Akron, Ohio in 2004. By 2019, the company grew to employ 50 people and operates out of a 15,000-square-foot building on Bowery Street. Stillman famously started building pedals by attempting to make a satisfactory clone of the Fuzz Face guitar effects pedal 50 times before he was satisfied. According to Stillman, the pedal making business was "just a hobby that went awry and turned into a pretty big global business."

In 2019, EarthQuaker Devices was recognized by the U.S. Small Business Administration as the Small Business Exporter of the Year. At the time of the award, EarthQuaker distributed their products to 47 countries while producing all devices at the Akron, Ohio facility.

Associated Artists and Artist Collaborations 
EarthQuaker Devices products are used by numerous musical acts including The Black Keys, Coldplay, and Paul Simon. The company has also created limited-run pedals associated with musical acts and artists including the Earthquaker Devices x Sunn O))): Life pedal created in collaboration with Sunn O))) and special editions of the Acapulco Gold and Tentacle pedals created in collaboration with Mark Mothersbaugh.

Activism and Advocacy 
Earthquaker Devices posted publicly in support of the Black Lives Matter movement on their Instagram account on June 4, 2020. The company has also hosted blogs on Black Lives Matter advocacy in the music industry as well as sexism in the industry. In July, 2020 the company ceased their sponsorship of the Akron Art Museum concert series, a relationship that had lasted several years. CEO Julie Robbins explained the decision by saying that "I have been following the situation ... regarding the complaints of former employees [about] racist behavior, sexual harassment, discrimination and toxic work environment at the Akron Art Museum."

References 

Guitar effects manufacturing companies
Companies based in Akron, Ohio